The 2019 FIVB Volleyball Women's Challenger Cup qualification  is a series of tournaments to decide teams which will play in the 2019 FIVB Volleyball Women's Challenger Cup. The 2019 Challenger Cup will feature 6 teams. Only one place will be allocated to the hosts. The remaining 5 places will be determined by a qualification process, in which entrants from among the other teams from the five FIVB confederations will compete.

Qualification summary
A total of 6 teams qualified for the tournament.

Confederation qualification

AVC (Asia and Oceania)
FIVB selected Kazakhstan to represent the Asian team for 2019 FIVB Volleyball Women's Challenger Cup via FIVB World Rankings, because less than four teams participated in the qualification tournament. But Kazakhstan and Australia teams refused to participate.

CEV (Europe)

Teams

  (Golden league)
  (Golden league)
  (Golden league → final round)
  (Golden league → final round → qualified)
  (Golden league → final round → qualified)
  (Golden league)
  (Golden league)
  (Golden league)
  (Golden league)
  (Golden league → final round)
  (Golden league)
  (Golden league)

League round

CSV (South America)
FIVB selected Argentina to represent the South American team for 2019 FIVB Volleyball Women's Challenger Cup via FIVB World Rankings.

NORCECA (North America)

Venue:  Sportplex Beau-Chateau, Quebec, Canada
Dates: 31 May-2 June 2018

Teams
  (round robin → qualified)
  (round robin)
  (round robin)
  (withdrew)

Final positions (round robin)

African–South American Playoff

Teams

Result

|}

References

 
FIVB Volleyball Women's Challenger Cup qualification